The 1987 Scottish League Cup final was played on 25 October 1987 at Hampden Park in Glasgow and was the final of the 42nd Scottish League Cup competition. The final was contested by Aberdeen and Rangers. Rangers defeated Aberdeen 5–3 on penalties after the sides drew 3–3.

Match details

See also
 Aberdeen F.C.–Rangers F.C. rivalry

References

External links
 Soccerbase 

1987
League Cup Final
Scottish League Cup Final 1987
Scottish League Cup Final 1987
20th century in Glasgow
Scottish League Cup Final 1987